The 2008 World Polo Championship, eight edition, took place in Mexico during May 2008 and was won by Chile.

Background
This event will bring together eight teams from around the world in the Campo Marte of the Mexican capital, where they will play the finals, and all three pitches Tecamac Polo Club, located in the state of Mexico, the Federal District neighboring entity.

Already confirmed the selections are classified as at the end of 2007 completed the classification process. The seleccions participating are: Brazil, as reigning world champion in the category; Mexico, as host country, Canada, New Zealand, England, South Africa, Spain and Chile.

Mexico received the headquarters of the event thanks to the work of the entrepreneur Pablo Rincón Gallardo Corcuera, known as Mr.Polo in the Mexican community in the years and winner of 70 Cup Avila Camacho and Eduardo Sólorzano Barrón, holders Propolo century. The institution was unable to continue with the completion of the project because of the death in 2006 of Rincon-Gallardo. Since the start of efforts to achieve headquarters Propolo century was supported by the Family Bailleres who continue as sponsors via El Palacio de Hierro, one of the companies it owns.

A decision was taken to seek support for the International Polo (FIP) in the form of a postponement of the Championship. Originally open on November 20, 2007. The international governing body accepted at the same time that a new Organizing Committee took over concretize the tournament. Group headed by polista Alfredo Solorzano and the president of the Mexican Federation of Polo, Rogelio Igartúa.

Fixture and results

Pool results

Knockout stages

References

External links
 Federation of International Polo website
 Chilean Federation of Polo

2008
Sports competitions in Mexico City
World Polo Championship, 2008
Polo competitions in Mexico
May 2008 sports events in North America
2000s in Mexico City